Rob Roy is a 1995 American historical biographical drama film directed by Michael Caton-Jones. It stars Liam Neeson as Rob Roy MacGregor, an 18th-century Scottish clan chief who battles a sadistic nobleman in the Scottish Highlands. Jessica Lange, John Hurt, Tim Roth, Eric Stoltz, Brian Cox, and Jason Flemyng also star. Roth won the BAFTA Award for Best Actor in a Supporting Role and was nominated for the Academy Award for Best Supporting Actor for his portrayal of the aristocrat Archibald Cunningham.

The film is dedicated to two Scotsmen: film director Alexander MacKendrick and football player and manager Jock Stein.

Plot
In Scotland, 1714, Robert Roy MacGregor is chief of Clan MacGregor. Although providing the Lowland gentry with protection against cattle rustling, he barely manages to feed his people. Hoping to alleviate their and his poverty, MacGregor borrows £1,000 from James Graham, Marquess of Montrose, to establish himself as a cattle raiser and trader.

Wanting to leave England to flee legal troubles, his anglicized aristocrat relative Archibald Cunningham is sent to stay with Montrose. Montrose makes money off Cunningham by making wagers on sword contests that Cunningham's haughty manner and effeminate bearing bring upon himself. However, Cunningham is supremely skilled with a sword. Cunningham learns about MacGregor's money deal from Montrose's factor Killearn, and murders MacGregor's friend, Alan McDonald, to steal the money. MacGregor requests time from Montrose to find McDonald and the money. Montrose offers to waive the debt if MacGregor will testify falsely that Montrose's rival John Campbell, 2nd Duke of Argyll is a Jacobite. MacGregor refuses and Montrose vows to imprison him in the tolbooth until the debt is repaid. After MacGregor flees, Montrose seizes MacGregor's land to cover the debt, declaring him an outlaw and ordering Cunningham to bring him in "broken, but not dead". Redcoats slaughter MacGregor's cattle, burn his croft, and Cunningham rapes his wife Mary.

Mary understands that Cunningham intends to flush her husband out of hiding and makes his brother, Alasdair, who arrives too late to save her, swear to conceal knowledge of the rape. MacGregor refuses to permit his clan to wage war on Montrose. Instead, he decrees, "The tenderest part of the marquess is his purse. We'll hurt him there. Thieve his cattle, steal his rents." Betty, a maidservant at Montrose's estate, has become pregnant with Cunningham's child. When Killearn tells Montrose, Betty is dismissed from service and rejected by Cunningham. Betty seeks refuge with the MacGregors, revealing that she overheard Killearn and Cunningham plot to steal the money. To build a case against Cunningham, MacGregor abducts Killearn and imprisons him. Mary promises Killearn that he will be spared if he testifies against Cunningham, but Killearn taunts her with her rape. Realizing that Mary is pregnant, he threatens to tell MacGregor that Cunningham may be the father if she does not release him, leading Mary and Alasdair to kill him.

Montrose tells Cunningham that he suspects who really stole the money but does not care. Cunningham and the redcoats burn the Clan's crofts. MacGregor refuses to take the bait, but Alasdair attempts to snipe Cunningham and hits a redcoat. The redcoats shoot both Alasdair and another Clan member, Coll. Alasdair finally tells MacGregor about Mary's rape. Taken prisoner, MacGregor accuses Cunningham of murder, robbery and rape. Cunningham confirms the charges, and beats and tortures Rob. The following morning, Montrose orders MacGregor hanged from a nearby bridge. MacGregor loops the rope binding his hands around Cunningham's throat and then jumps off the bridge. To save Cunningham, Montrose orders the rope cut. 

Mary gains an audience with the Duke of Argyll and exposes Montrose's plan to frame him. Moved by MacGregor's integrity, he grants the family asylum at Glen Shira. MacGregor arrives, at first upset by Mary's unwillingness to inform him of her rape or her pregnancy but later willing to raise the child as his own. The Duke arranges a duel between MacGregor and Cunningham, wagering Montrose that if MacGregor lives, his debt will be forgiven and that if he dies, the Duke will pay his debt. Montrose agrees and Cunningham and MacGregor vow that no quarter will be asked or given. Armed with a rapier, Cunningham repeatedly wounds MacGregor, who appears to swiftly exhaust himself swinging a heavy broadsword. MacGregor seems defeated, but when Cunningham showboats to deliver a theatrical killing blow, MacGregor holds on to his enemy's sword-point with his left hand. As Cunningham struggles to free his blade, MacGregor delivers a fatal strike to Cunningham. Now free of debts and with his honor intact, he returns home to his wife and children.

Cast
 Liam Neeson as Rob Roy MacGregor
 Jessica Lange as Mary MacGregor
 John Hurt as James Graham, 4th Marquess of Montrose
 Tim Roth as Archibald Cunningham
 Eric Stoltz as Alan McDonald
 Andrew Keir as John Campbell, 2nd Duke of Argyll
 Brian Cox as Killearn
 Brian McCardie as Alasdair MacGregor
 Gilbert Martin as Guthrie, the Duke of Argyll's fencing champion
 Jason Flemyng as Gregor, a MacGregor Clan retainer
 Ewan Stewart as Coll, a MacGregor Clan retainer
 David Hayman as Tam Sibbalt, a Scottish Traveller who has been rustling from cattle herds under MacGregor's protection
 Shirley Henderson as Morag

Production
According to screenwriter Alan Sharp, Rob Roy was conceived as a Western set in the Scottish Highlands.

The film was shot entirely on location in Scotland, much of it in parts of the Highlands so remote they had to be reached by helicopter. Some of the scenes were filmed in Glen Coe, Glen Nevis, and Glen Tarbert. In the opening scenes, Rob and his men pass by Loch Leven. Loch Morar stood in for Loch Lomond, on the banks of which the real Rob Roy lived. Scenes of the Duke of Argyll's estate were shot at Castle Tioram, the Marquess of Montrose's at Drummond Castle.  Shots of "The Factor's Inn" were filmed outside Megginch Castle. Crichton Castle was used in a landscape shot.

Non-stop Highland rain presented a problem for cast and crew when filming outdoor shots, as did the resulting swarms of midges.

William Hobbs choreographed the swordfights, with Robert G. Goodwin consulting.

The main composer is Carter Burwell. Beside the film score, the film features a slightly different version of a traditional Gaelic song called "Ailein duinn", sung in the film by Karen Matheson, lead singer in Capercaillie.

Historical accuracy
MacGregor had business dealings with Montrose for 10 years before the loan of £1000 went missing. The character of Cunningham is fictional. Details of Rob Roy's life are a mix of fact and legend. According to one amateur British historian, the film portrays Rob Roy "in the most sympathetic light possible". Though called the Marquess of Montrose, James Graham, 4th Marquess of Montrose had already been elevated to Duke of Montrose at this point in history. He was raised to the dukedom as a reward for his support for the Act of Union, whilst being Lord President of the Scottish Privy Council.
Not all of the events shown in the film were real. The narration covers approximately the years 1712 to 1722, nevertheless the uprisings of 1715 and 1719 were not depicted in the film.

Release

Box office
United Artists gave Rob Roy a limited release in the United States and Canada on April 7, 1995, and the film grossed $2,023,272 from 133 theaters for the weekend. Five days later it expanded to 1,521 theaters and grossed $7,190,047 for the weekend, ranking number 2 at the US box office behind Bad Boys. Rob Roys widest release during its theatrical run was 1,885 theaters, and the film grossed $31,596,911 in the United States and Canada. Internationally it grossed $27.1 million for a worldwide total of $58.7 million.

Critical reception
Rob Roy received a generally positive critical response. On Rotten Tomatoes it has an approval rating of 73% based on reviews from 44 critics. On Metacritic it has an average score of 55 out of 100, based on reviews from 19 critics. Audiences surveyed by CinemaScore gave the film a grade "B+" on scale of A+ to F.

Roger Ebert, writing for the Chicago Sun-Times, said, "This is a splendid, rousing historical adventure, an example of what can happen when the best direction, acting, writing and technical credits are brought to bear on what might look like shopworn material." Ebert said the film's outline could have led to "yet another tired" historical epic, but he found that the director was able to produce "intense character studies". The critic applauded Tim Roth's performance, calling it "crucial" to the film's success. Ebert was also impressed by the climactic sword fighting scene and called it "one of the great action sequences in movie history". His partner Gene Siskel agreed, calling it the "best sword fight in motion picture history."

In contrast, Rita Kempley of The Washington Post compared Rob Roy negatively to the action films Death Wish (1974) and First Blood (1982). Kempley disliked the film's violence and wrote, "Frankly, Rob Roy is about as bright as one of his cows. He doesn't even recognize that his obsession with honor will lead to the destruction of his clan." The critic found the protagonist unheroic in his mission for vengeance. Of his enemy, she said, "The villains, played with glee, manage to perk up the glacial pace, but they too grow tiresome."

In The New York Times, Janet Maslin gave a mixed review of the film. She complained of the film's "long, dry stretches" and that the "plot [was] too ponderous and uninteresting for the film's visual sweep". Maslin said one of the film's saving graces was the "robust" presence of Liam Neeson, taller than those who played his enemies, and his character's charismatic exchange with Jessica Lange's character, writing, "Rob Roy is best watched for local color and for its hearty, hot-blooded stars." Maslin acknowledged that Neeson was "a far cry from the dour-looking Scottish drover who was the real Rob Roy" and said that the film failed to convey the figure's importance to audiences. The critic highlighted the scene of Cunningham raping Mary as one of the film's "strongest scenes" which was appropriately responded to by the "cowboy justice" of Neeson's lonesome and avenging Rob Roy.

Accolades

The film is recognized by American Film Institute in these lists:
 2003: AFI's 100 Years...100 Heroes & Villains:
 Archibald Cunningham – Nominated Villain

See also
Clan MacGregor
Scottish clan
Siol Alpin
Braveheart

References

External links

 
 
 
 
 Rob Roy: Man in the middle by Jump Cut: A Review of Contemporary Media

1995 films
1990s biographical drama films
1990s historical films
1995 romantic drama films
American biographical drama films
American epic films
Remakes of American films
American romantic drama films
Cultural depictions of Rob Roy MacGregor
Drama films based on actual events
Epic films based on actual events
Films scored by Carter Burwell
Films about families
Films about miscarriage of justice
Films about murder
Films about outlaws
Films about poverty
American films about revenge
Films directed by Michael Caton-Jones
Films set in Scotland
Films set in the 1710s
Films set in the 1720s
Films shot in Scotland
Films about rape
Romance films based on actual events
American swashbuckler films 
United Artists films
American historical romance films
BAFTA winners (films)
1990s English-language films
1990s American films